DTM—İstanbul Fuar Merkezi is a station on the M1 line of the Istanbul Metro in Bakırköy, Istanbul. The station consists of an elevated island platform servicing two tracks within the Istanbul World Trade Center.

DTM—İstanbul Fuar Merkezi station was opened on 20 December 2002 as part of the westward extension of the M1 to Atatürk Airport.

Layout

References

External links
DTM—İstanbul Fuar Merkezi in Google Street View

Railway stations opened in 2002
2002 establishments in Turkey
Istanbul metro stations
Bakırköy